Una and UNA may refer to:

People
 Una (given name), including a list of people and fictional characters with the name

Arts and entertainment
 Una (film), a 2016 drama
 Una, a 1981 novel by Momo Kapor
 The Una, a woman's rights magazine, launched 1853
 UNA (band), an American electronica band
 "Una" (song), by Sponge Cola, 2004

Businesses and organisations

Political groups
 United for a New Alternative, Argentina
 United Nationalist Alliance, Philippines
 United Negros Alliance, Philippines

Universities
 Universidad Nacional de las Artes, Argentina
 Universidad Nacional de Asunción, Paraguay
 University of North Alabama, Unites States
 University of The Netherlands Antilles, now the University of Curaçao

Other businesses and organisations
 UNA Hotels & Resorts, an Italian hotel chain
 United Nations Association, a non-governmental organization
 United Nurses Association, an Indian professional association 
 Ukrainian National Association, a North American fraternal organization

Military uses
 Una-class submarine, a class of Yugoslav midget submarines
 Ukrainian People's Army, or Ukrainian National Army, 1917–1921
 Ukrainian National Army, 1945

Places
 Una, Bahia, Brazil
 Una, Himachal Pradesh, India
 Una district
 Una, Himachal Pradesh Assembly constituency
 Una Himachal railway station
 Una, Gujarat, India
 Una, Gujarat Assembly constituency
 Una, Mississippi, United States
 Uña, Castile-La Mancha, Spain
 Una National Park, Bosnia and Herzegovina
 Una River (disambiguation), several uses
 160 Una, an asteroid named after the Faerie Queene character

Other uses
 Una (butterfly), a genus of butterflies
 Una language, or goliath, a Papuan language 
 Una virus, a virus species
 , a Hudson's Bay Company vessel
 VV UNA, a Dutch football club

See also

 Una-Una, Indonesia, an island
 Uma (disambiguation)
 Yuna (disambiguation)
 Unas (disambiguation)